The Malindi Solar Power Station is a  solar power plant in Kenya.

Location

Overview
The power station has a 52 megawatt capacity. Its output is planned to be sold directly to the Kenya Power and Lighting Company for integration into the national grid. It is expected most of the power generated will be consumed locally, in an area with increasing energy demand, limited energy supply and an expanding population. It is also anticipated that the power station will support the creation of jobs through direct employment and indirect job creation through more consistent supply of electricity. Up to 250 direct jobs are expected to be created, in addition to a further 5,600 jobs in the wider economy.

Developers
The power station was developed by a consortium of comprising the following corporations: (a) Commonwealth Development Corporation (b) Globeleq (c) Africa Energy Development Corporation (AEDC), the originator of the project and (d) IDEA Power.

Ownership
When completed the power station will be owned by Malindi Solar Group Limited, a special purpose vehicle company, which will operate the solar energy project. The ownership of Malindi Solar Group Limited is as illustrated in the table below:

Construction costs, funding, and commissioning
The construction of the solar power plant is budgeted at US$66 million, with US$50 million sourced from the CDC Group and US$16 million sourced from Globeleq. It was expected that the power station would come online in 2020. In January 2022, Afrik21.africa reported that the power station had started "commercial operations".

See also

Alten Solar Power Station
Eldosol Solar Power Station
Radiant Solar Power Station

References

External links
 Sh6 Billion Malindi Solar Power Plan At Risk As Companies Feud As of 8 February 2018.
 Kenya: Globeleq will soon launch Malindi Solar Park construction As of 7 June 2019.

Solar power stations in Kenya
 
Kilifi County
2022 establishments in Kenya
Energy infrastructure completed in 2022